The Eckle Round Barn is a historic building that was located near Shelby in rural Pottawattamie County, Iowa, United States. The true round barn was built by Ed Brown and George Robinson in 1928 for Richard Eckle. The barn featured white horizontal siding, a two-pitch sectional roof, aerator and a central clay tile silo with a  diameter. The barn was listed on the National Register of Historic Places in 1986. It has subsequently been torn down.

References

 

Infrastructure completed in 1928
Buildings and structures in Pottawattamie County, Iowa
National Register of Historic Places in Pottawattamie County, Iowa
Barns on the National Register of Historic Places in Iowa
Round barns in Iowa